Songs That Saved My Life is a compilation album by American record label Hopeless Records, in partnership with Sub City Records, released on November 9, 2018. The album contains various studio covers from post-hardcore, pop punk, and alternative rock bands in honor of suicide prevention.

The compilation album's lead single, a cover of "Torn" by Welsh rock band Neck Deep, was released on World Suicide Prevention Day, September 10, 2018.

Background

Songs That Saved My Life was first unveiled by Hopeless Records and Sub City on Monday, September 10, 2018. In support of the announcement, the label released the compilation album's lead single, a cover of "Torn" by Welsh rock band Neck Deep, accompanied with its music video.

Promotion

On September 10, 2018, Welsh rock band Neck Deep released their studio cover of Natalie Imbruglia's version of "Torn" by Ednaswap, along with its music video.

Track listing

Songs That Saved My Life Volume 2

Following the success of the first Songs That Saved My Life, Hopeless Records and Sub City, who released the album, announced a second volume was in the works and confirmed its release later that year. The album was released on November 8, 2019, approximately one year after the first volume. Like its predecessor, the album features bands covering songs that helped them through a difficult time in their lives, in the hopes that these versions would help those who also struggle find a voice and speak out. A portion of the proceeds went to many charities that focus around suicide and mental health. In support of the album, a single was released with State Champs covering "Real World", by Matchbox Twenty.

Additional songs

Additional standalone singles were released as part of the STSML brand in the years following the release of Volume 2:
 Weathers - "Lucky" (originally by Britney Spears)
 AJJ - "Candy Jail" (originally by Silver Jews)
 Said the Sky, Olivver the Kid, Levi the Poet - "Worth Living For" (a new song billed as a "Songs That Saved My Life Original")
 NOAHFINNCE (feat. Sydney Dolezal and Meghan Herring of Doll Skin) - "Parents" (originally by Yungblud)
 Aaron West and the Roaring Twenties - "Thunder Road" (originally by Bruce Springsteen)
 We the Kings - "Fix You" (originally by Coldplay)

References

2018 compilation albums
Hopeless Records albums
Hopeless Records compilation albums
Charity albums